This season was officially discontinued by PSSI on May 2, 2015 due to a ban by Imam Nahrawi, Minister of Youth and Sports Affairs, against PSSI to run any football competition. On one side the contract has been signed by players and coaches, but on the other hand, in the absence of a competition that runs there will be no income for the club especially to hire players and coaches

The conflict made the soccer clubs from Central Java in coordination with the local branch of PSSI took the sponsors and the Central Java Regional Police to run a competition that followed clubs from Central Java. Finally formed a competition called Polda Jateng Cup. On this occasion PSIS Semarang involving players who have been banned for scandal in 2014 and featuring one of the lively legend of PSIS Semarang, M. Ridwan.

Squad 
PSIS Semarang who registered for POLDA Jateng Cup:

Result

POLDA Jateng Cup 
PSIS Semarang success to winning Polda Jateng Cup, they win 1-0 over Persis Solo in a Final.

 

Sumber : http://bidhuan.com/2015/05/26/hasil-dan-klasemen-sementara-piala-polda-jateng-2015/

References 

Indonesian football clubs 2015 season
PSIS Semarang seasons